The 2016 European Open Water Championships took place from 10 to 14 July 2016 in Hoorn (Netherlands), organized by European Swimming Federation LEN.

Medal table

Prize money 
LEN awarded best 3 swimmers each race following pricemoney:

Trophy 
Best Swimmers 2 swimmers each nation each event got points for championships trophy. It was awarded to the nation with the highest number of points, according to

Results women

5 kilometer 

Date: 12 July 2016

10 kilometer 

Date: 10 July 2016

25 kilometer 

Date: 14 July 2016

Results men

5 kilometer 

Date: 12 July 2016

10 kilometer 

Date: 10 July 2016

25 kilometer 

Date: 14 July 2016

Results team event

5 kilometer 

Date: 13 July 2016

References

External links 
 Results MicroPlus Timing for LEN European Open Water Swimming Championships Hoorn 2016

European Open Water Swimming Championships
European Open Water
European Open Water
International aquatics competitions hosted by the Netherlands
European Open Water Championships
Sports competitions in North Holland
Sport in Hoorn